Remelhe is a Portuguese freguesia ("civil parish"), located in the municipality of Barcelos. The population in 2011 was 1,309, in an area of 6.12 km².

References

Freguesias of Barcelos, Portugal